Schistosoma is a genus of trematodes, commonly known as blood flukes. They are parasitic flatworms responsible for a highly significant group of infections in humans termed schistosomiasis, which is considered by the World Health Organization as the second-most socioeconomically devastating parasitic disease (after malaria), with hundreds of millions infected worldwide.

Adult flatworms parasitize blood capillaries of either the mesenteries or plexus of the bladder, depending on the infecting species. They are unique among trematodes and any other flatworms in that they are dioecious with distinct sexual dimorphism between male and female. Thousands of eggs are released and reach either the bladder or the intestine (according to the infecting species), and these are then excreted in urine or feces to fresh water. Larvae must then pass through an intermediate snail host, before the next larval stage of the parasite emerges that can infect a new mammalian host by directly penetrating the skin.

Evolution

The origins of this genus remain unclear. For many years it was believed that this genus had an African origin, but DNA sequencing suggests that the species (S. edwardiense and S. hippopotami) that infect the hippo (Hippopotamus amphibius) could be basal. Since hippos were present in both Africa and Asia during the Cenozoic era, the genus might have originated as parasites of hippos. The original hosts for the South East Asian species were probably rodents.

The sister group to Schistosoma is a genus of elephant-infecting schistosomes — Bivitellobilharzia.

The cattle, sheep, goat and cashmere goat parasite Orientobilharzia turkestanicum appears to be related to the African schistosomes. This latter species has since been transferred to the genus Schistosoma.

Within the haematobium group S. bovis and S. curassoni appear to be closely related as do S. leiperi and S. mattheei.

S. mansoni appears to have evolved in East Africa 0.43–0.30 million years ago.

S. mansoni and S. rodhaini appear to have shared a common ancestor between 107.5 and 147.6 thousand years ago. This period overlaps with the earliest archaeological evidence for fishing in Africa. It appears that S. mansoni originated in East Africa and experienced a decline in effective population size 20-90 thousand years ago before dispersing across the continent during the Holocene. This species was later transmitted to the Americas by the slave trade.

S. incognitum and S. nasale are more closely related to the African species rather than the japonicum group.

S. sinensium appears to have radiated during the Pliocene.

S. mekongi appears to have invaded South East Asia in the mid-Pleistocene.

Estimated speciation dates for the japonicum group: ~3.8 million years ago for S. japonicum/South East Asian schistosoma and ~2.5 million years ago for S. malayensis/S. mekongi.

Schistosoma turkestanicum is found infecting red deer in Hungary. These strains appear to have diverged from those found in China and Iran. The date of divergence appears to be 270,000 years before present.

Taxonomy
The genus Schistosoma as currently defined is paraphyletic, so revisions are likely. Over twenty species are recognised within this genus.

The genus has been divided  into four groups: indicum, japonicum, haematobium and mansoni. The affinities of the remaining species are still being clarified.

Thirteen species are found in Africa. Twelve of these are divided into two groups—those with a lateral spine on the egg (mansoni group) and those with a terminal spine (haematobium group).

Mansoni group
The four mansoni group species are: S. edwardiense, S. hippotami, S. mansoni and S. rodhaini.

Haematobium group
The nine haematobium group species are: S. bovis, S. curassoni,  S. guineensis, S. haematobium, S. intercalatum, S. kisumuensis, S. leiperi, S. margrebowiei and S. mattheei.

S. leiperi and S. matthei appear to be related. S. margrebowiei is basal in this group. S. guineensis is the sister species to the S. bovis and S. curassoni grouping. S. intercalatum may actually be a species complex of at least two species.

Indicum group
The indicum group has three species: S. indicum, S. nasale and S. spindale. This group appears to have evolved during the Pleistocene. All use pulmonate snails as hosts.  S. spindale is widely distributed in Asia, but is also found in Africa. They occur in Asia and India.

S. indicum is found in India and Thailand.

The indicum group appears to be the sister clade to the African species.

Japonicum group
The japonicum group has five species: S. japonicum, S. malayensis and S. mekongi, S. ovuncatum and S. sinensium and these species are found in China and Southeast Asia.

S. ovuncatum forms a clade with S. sinensium and is found in northern Thailand. The definitive host is unknown and the intermediate host is the snail Tricula bollingi. This species is known to use snails of the family Pomatiopsidae as hosts.

S. incognitum appears to be basal in this genus. It may be more closely related to the African-Indian species than to the Southeast Asian group. This species uses pulmonate snails as hosts. Examination of the mitochondria suggests that Schistosoma incognitum may be a species complex.

New species
As of 2012, four additional species have been transferred to this genus., previously classified as species in the genus Orientobilharzia. Orientobilharzia differs from Schistosoma morphologically only on the basis of the number of testes. A review of the morphological and molecular data has shown that the differences between these genera are too small to justify their separation. The four species are

Schistosoma bomfordi
Schistosoma datta
Schistosoma harinasutai
Schistosoma turkestanicum

Hybrids
The hybrid S. haematobium-S.guineenis was observed in Cameroon in 1996. S. haematobium could establish itself only after deforestation of the tropical rainforest in Loum next to the endemic S. guineensis; hybridization led to competitive exclusion of S. guineensis.
 
In 2003, a S. mansoni-S. rodhaini hybrid was found in snails in western Kenya,  As of 2009, it had not been found in humans.

In 2009, S. haematobium–S. bovis hybrids were described in northern Senegalese children. The Senegal River Basin had changed very much since the 1980s after the Diama Dam in Senegal and the Manantali Dam in Mali had been built. The Diama dam prevented ocean water to enter and allowed new forms of agriculture. Human migration, increasing number of livestock and sites where human and cattle both contaminate the water facilitated mixing between the different schistosomes in N'Der, for example. The same hybrid was identified during the 2015 investigation of a schistosomiasis outbreak on Corsica, traced to the Cavu river.

In 2019, a S. haematobium–S. mansoni hybrid was described in a 14-year-old patient with hematuria from Côte d'Ivoire.

Cladogram
A cladogram based on 18S ribosomal RNA, 28S ribosomal RNA, and partial cytochrome c oxidase subunit I (COI)  genes shows phylogenic relations of species in the genus Schistosoma:

Comparison of eggs

Geographical distribution
Geographical areas associated with schistosomiasis by the World Health Organization as of January 2017 include in alphabetical order: Africa, Brazil, Cambodia, the Caribbean, China, Corsica, Indonesia, Laos, the Middle East, the Philippines, Suriname, and Venezuela.  There had been no cases in Europe since 1965, until an outbreak occurred on Corsica.

Schistosomiasis

The parasitic flatworms of Schistosoma cause a group of chronic infections called schistosomiasis known also as bilharziasis.  An anti-schistosome drug is a schistosomicide.

Species infecting humans
Parasitism of humans by Schistosoma appears to have evolved at least three occasions in both Asia and Africa.

S. guineensis, a recently described species, is found in West Africa. Known snail intermediate hosts include Bulinus forskalii.
S. haematobium, commonly referred to as the bladder fluke, originally found in Africa, the Near East, and the Mediterranean basin, was introduced into India during World War II. Freshwater snails of the genus Bulinus are an important intermediate host for this parasite. Among final hosts humans are most important. Other final hosts are rarely baboons and monkeys.
S. intercalatum. The usual final hosts are humans. Other animals can be infected experimentally.
S. japonicum, whose common name is simply blood fluke, is widespread in East Asia and the southwestern Pacific region. Freshwater snails of the genus Oncomelania are an important intermediate host for S. japonicum. Final hosts are humans and other mammals including cats, dogs, goats, horses, pigs, rats and water buffalo.
S. malayensis This species appears to be a rare infection in humans and is considered to be a zoonosis . The natural vertebrate host is Müller's giant Sunda rat (Sundamys muelleri). The snail hosts are Robertsiella species (R. gismanni, R. kaporensis and R. silvicola (see Attwood et al. 2005 Journal of Molluscan Studies Volume 71, Issue 4 pp. 379–391).
S. mansoni, found in Africa, Brazil, Venezuela, Suriname, the lesser Antilles, Puerto Rico, and the Dominican Republic. It is also known as Manson's blood fluke or swamp fever. Freshwater snails of the genus Biomphalaria are an important intermediate host for this trematode. Among final hosts humans are most important. Other final hosts are baboons, rodents and raccoons.
S. mekongi is related to S. japonicum and affects both the superior and inferior mesenteric veins. S. mekongi differs in that it has smaller eggs, a different intermediate host (Neotricula aperta) and longer prepatent period in the mammalian host. Final hosts are humans and dogs. The snail Tricula aperta can also be experimentally infected with this species.

Species infecting other animals
Schistosoma indicum, Schistosoma nasale, Schistosoma spindale, Schistosoma leiperi are all parasites of ruminants.

Schistosoma edwardiense and Schistosoma hippopotami are parasites of the hippo.

Schistosoma ovuncatum and Schistosoma sinensium are parasites of rodents.

Morphology
Adult schistosomes share all the fundamental features of the digenea. They have a basic bilateral symmetry, oral and ventral suckers, a body covering of a syncytial tegument, a blind-ending digestive system consisting of mouth, esophagus and bifurcated caeca; the area between the tegument and alimentary canal filled with a loose network of mesoderm cells, and an excretory or osmoregulatory system based on flame cells.

Reproduction

Unlike other trematodes and basically all other flatworms, the schistosomes are dioecious, i.e., the sexes are separate. The two sexes display a strong degree of sexual dimorphism, and the male is considerably larger than the female. The male surrounds the female and encloses her within his gynacophoric canal for the entire adult lives of the worms. As the male feeds on the host's blood, he passes some of it to the female. The male also passes on chemicals which complete the female's development, whereupon they will reproduce sexually. Although rare, sometimes mated schistosomes will "divorce", wherein the female will leave the male for another male. The exact reason is not understood, although it is thought that females will leave their partners to mate with more genetically distant males. Such a biological mechanism would serve to decrease inbreeding, and may be a factor behind the unusually high genetic diversity of schistosomes.

Genome
The genomes of Schistosoma haematobium, S. japonicum and S. mansoni have been reported.

History
The eggs of these parasites were first seen by Theodor Maximilian Bilharz, a German pathologist working in Egypt in 1851 who found the eggs of Schistosoma haematobium during the course of a post mortem. He wrote two letters to his former teacher von Siebold in May and August 1851 describing his findings. Von Siebold published a paper in 1852 summarizing Bilharz's findings and naming the worms Distoma haematobium. Bilharz wrote a paper in 1856 describing the worms more fully. Their unusual morphology meant that they could not be comfortably included in Distoma. So in 1856 Meckel von Helmsback (de) created the genus Bilharzia for them. In 1858 David Friedrich Weinland proposed the name Schistosoma (Greek: "split body") because the worms were not hermaphroditic but had separate sexes. Despite Bilharzia having precedence, the genus name Schistosoma was officially adopted by the International Commission on Zoological Nomenclature. The term Bilharzia to describe infection with these parasites is still in use in medical circles.

Bilharz also described Schistosoma mansoni, but this species was redescribed by Louis Westenra Sambon in 1907 at the London School of Tropical Medicine who named it after his teacher Patrick Manson.

In 1898, all then known species were placed in a subfamily by Stiles and Hassel. This was elevated to family status by Looss in 1899. Poche in 1907 corrected a grammatical error in the family name. The life cycle of  Schistosoma mansoni was determined by the Brazilian parasitologist Pirajá da Silva (1873-1961) in 1908.

In 2009, the genomes of Schistosoma mansoni and Schistosoma japonicum were decoded  opening the way for new targeted treatments. In particular, the study discovered that the genome of S. mansoni contained 11,809 genes, including many that produce enzymes for breaking down proteins, enabling the parasite to bore through tissue. Also, S. mansoni does not have an enzyme to make certain fats, so it must rely on its host to produce these.

Treatment

Praziquantel

References

Further reading

External links 

British Department for International Development Control of Schistosomiasis
The World Health Organisation page on Schistosomiasis
University of Cambridge Schistosome Laboratory
Schistosoma parasites overview, biology, life cycle image at MetaPathogen

Digenea genera
Parasitic helminths of humans
Diplostomida